Allium caeruleum (blue globe onion, blue ornamental onion, blue-of-the-heavens, blue-flowered garlic; syn. Allium azureum Ledeb.) is an ornamental bulbous plant of the onion genus, native to Central Asia (Kazakhstan, Kyrgyzstan, Siberia, Tajikistan, Uzbekistan, and Xinjiang). In these regions, it is found on dry slopes, plains, and steppes.

This plant is cited in the Flore des Serres et des Jardins de l'Europe puis L'illustration horticole by Charles Antoine Lemaire. It grows to 80 cm (31"), producing strap-shaped leaves and small globes (umbels) of blue flowers in early summer. The one-inch wide globular flower heads attract butterflies. The plant has been granted the British Royal Horticultural Society's Award of Garden Merit (1993).

A. caeruleum thrives in well-drained soil in full to partial sun. It is deer-resistant and suitable for USDA hardiness zones 4–8.

Gallery

References

caeruleum
Garden plants of Asia
Flora of South European Russia
Flora of Kazakhstan
Flora of Kyrgyzstan
Flora of Tajikistan
Flora of Uzbekistan
Flora of Altai (region)
Flora of Xinjiang
Plants described in 1773
Taxa named by Peter Simon Pallas